John D. Baldeschwieler (born 1933) is an American chemist who has made significant contributions in molecular structure and spectroscopy.

Born on November 14, 1933, in Elizabeth, New Jersey, he was an alumnus of Cornell University (B.S., 1956, Chemical Engineering) and the University of California, Berkeley (Ph.D., 1959). He has taught at Harvard University, Stanford University and currently is the J. Stanley Johnson Professor and Professor of Chemistry, Emeritus at Caltech.

Awards and recognition
Baldeschwieler has received multiple awards for his research, including the National Medal of Science, awarded in 2000, "For his imaginative development of new methods for determining the properties, structures, motions and interactions of molecules and molecular assemblies, the translation of these advances into practical pharmaceutical and instrumentation products for the public benefit, and extensive service to his government and the scientific community." He was elected to the National Academy of Sciences in 1970, the American Academy of Arts and Sciences in 1972 and the American Philosophical Society in 1979.

Additional awards include:

 1962 - 1965 	Alfred P. Sloan Fellowship
 1967 	Award in Pure Chemistry, American Chemical Society
 1968 	Fresenius Award of Phi Lambda Upsilon
 1989 	Richard C. Tolman Medal, American Chemical Society
 1990 	William H. Nichols Medal, American Chemical Society
 2001 	Award for Creative Invention, American Chemical Society
 2003 	Othmer Gold Medal, Chemical Heritage Foundation

References

External links
 
 

21st-century American chemists
National Medal of Science laureates
Cornell University College of Engineering alumni
UC Berkeley College of Chemistry alumni
Harvard University faculty
Stanford University Department of Chemistry faculty
California Institute of Technology faculty
United States Army soldiers
1933 births
Members of the United States National Academy of Sciences
Living people